Maasi is a 2012 Tamil language action film written and directed by G. Kicha and produced by Kovai Mani. This film stars Arjun in the lead role, while Dhina composed the film's music. The film released after much delay on 16 March 2012 and opened with negative reviews.

Plot 
Inspector Maasilamani aka Maasi (Arjun Sarja) is an Encounter specialist, who deals gangsters with an iron first unequivocally. His senior officer hates his guts and also has ties with the gangsters. Two gangs one headed by Naaga (Pradeep Rawat) and another by Nandha (Ponnambalam), who's supported by Home Minister Paramasivam (Kota Srinivasa Rao) are fighting for domination and want to keep Chennai city under their control. Turf wars, settling scores in the game for power and domination reduces Maasi to a pawn. Maasi beating all the odds stacked against him and eradicating the gangs thus establishing peace in the city forms the rest of the story.

Cast

 Arjun Sarja as Inspector Maasilamani aka Maasi, Encounter Specialist
 Archana Gupta as Lakshmi
 Hema as Maasilamani's wife 
 Pradeep Rawat as Naaga
 Satya Prakash as Naaga's Brother
 Kota Srinivasa Rao as Home Minister Paramasivam
 Ponnambalam as Nandha
 Telangana Shakuntala as Gangamma
 Mahadevan as Maasilamani's Senior Officer, who helps Maasi
 Kalairani as Maasilamani's mother
 Bala Singh 
 Gowtham Sundararajan as Balu, Police Officer in Maasilamani's Encounter squad
 Santhana Bharathi as Maasilamani's Corrupt Senior Officer
 Mayilswamy as Thief

Production
Arjun signed on to appear in Kicha's film titled Kallan in March 2009, which would see him play a police officer. The title was later changed to Maasi and the film's launch was held on 1 April 2009 at a private club in the presence of the members of the cast and crew. The film's audio launch was held on 26 May 2010 with actor Karthi and Hansraj Saxena of Sun Pictures releasing the disk in a grand scale function. At a press conference, Kicha announced that two of his police films Bhavani and Maasi would see back to back releases in July 2010, though the deadline passed without further news. The film was set to release in late August 2011 alongside Arjun's other film Mankatha, but ran into a legal tussle with the makers of Idhudhanda Police — 2. The team of that film claimed they bought the remake rights of the Hindi film, Risk and based their Idhudhanda Police — 2 on it. They appealed that Maasi had copied almost 75 per cent of the scenes from the Hindi film that they were remaking and obtained an order in Hyderabad City Civil Court to stay the release of the film, and subsequently caused a delay. The film was further delayed in early 2012, when the director was arrested for failing to return an advance payment he had received from another producer, hence Tamil Kumaran sought a stay on the film.

Soundtrack 
Soundtrack was composed by Dhina, with lyrics written by Dhina and Yugabharathi (Unakkaaga Unakkaga).

"Kandene" - Hariharan, Sadhana Sargam
"Ondikondi" - Rita
"Unakkaga" - Udit Narayan, Sowmya Raoh
"Singanadai" - Ananthu
"Naan Paartha" - Shankar Mahadevan, Saindhavi
"Kandene" - Hariharan, Anbulakshmi

Release
The film opened after three years of production in a few screens across Tamil Nadu on 16 March 2012 to negative reviews. Sify.com labelled the film as "tedious", though stated "watch it if you're a fan of Arjun, he is charismatic, look fit at this age and has an alluring appeal that lifts this film considerably." A critic from Behindwoods gave the film one star out of five, concluding it is a "highly predictable shoot out". Indiaglitz written "Had the sequence of events had some coherence, the film would have been more engaging". Nowrunning written the film as "standard police procedural". Times of India criticised that film failed in all departments. Hindu wrote "The action king doesn't need a Maasi to live up to the sobriquet".

References

2012 films
Indian action films
2012 masala films
2012 action films
2010s Tamil-language films
Fictional portrayals of the Tamil Nadu Police